City On A Hill is a series of praise and worship music compilations performed by contemporary Christian musicians and produced by Steve Hindalong, Derri Daugherty, and Marc Byrd, who are current members of Christian rock band the Choir. The project includes 

City on a Hill: Songs of Worship and Praise (2000)
City on a Hill: Sing Alleluia (2002)
City on a Hill: It's Christmas Time (2002)
City on a Hill: The Gathering (2003)

Artists who have collaborated on the various recordings include Jars of Clay, Dan Haseltine, Third Day, Mac Powell, Caedmon's Call, Derek Webb, Sixpence None the Richer, Leigh Nash, Phil Keaggy, Peter Furler, Terry Scott Taylor, Gene Eugene, Derri Daugherty, Paul Colman Trio, Far From Home, Out of Eden, Silers Bald, Jennifer Knapp, Nichole Nordeman, Sara Groves, Andrew Peterson, Bebo Norman, Ginny Owens, Julie Miller, Fernando Ortega and Nashville String Machine.

Quotes

External links
City On A Hill concept page

Compilation album series